Qameshlu Castle is a historical castle located in Tiran and Karvan County in Isfahan Province, The longevity of this fortress dates back to the Qajar dynasty.

References 

Castles in Iran
Qajar castles